Apeira is a genus of moths in the family Geometridae first described by Johannes von Nepomuk Franz Xaver Gistel in 1848.

Species
 Apeira crenularia (Leech, 1897)
 Apeira ectocausta (Wehrli, 1935)
 Apeira latimarginaria (Leech, 1897)
 Apeira marmorataria (Leech, 1897)
 Apeira olivaria (Leech, 1897)
 Apeira productaria (Leech, 1897)
 Apeira syringaria (Linnaeus, 1758) – lilac beauty
 Apeira versicolor (Warren, 1894)
 Apeira viridescens (Warren, 1894)

References

Ennomini
Geometridae genera
Taxa named by Johannes von Nepomuk Franz Xaver Gistel